This article describes the qualification procedure for EuroBasket 2015.

Qualification format 
In the first qualifying round, 13 teams which didn't qualify for EuroBasket 2013 have been divided into four groups. The winners of each group advance to the knockout stage, composed by two semifinals and one final series under a home-and-away format.

The champion of the first qualifying round qualifies directly for EuroBasket 2015, while the rest of the teams join 14 EuroBasket 2013 teams which did not qualify directly for the 2015 edition in the second qualifying round.

First round
13 teams played in the first qualifying round during the middle of 2013.

Denmark returned to the competition for the first time since 2010, while Azerbaijan, Albania and Cyprus did not take part in this edition after playing in the qualifying round in 2012.

Seedings

Group stage

All times are local.

Group A

|}

Group B

|-
|align=left| || 4 || 1 || 3 || 134 || 157 || –23 || 3
|}

1The Netherlands were voided of two wins for playing two naturalised players.

Group C

|}

Group D

|}

Knockout stage

Bracket

Semifinals

First leg

Second leg

Final

First leg

Second leg

Second round

Seedings

In the second qualifying round, 26 teams were drawn into five groups of four teams and two groups of three teams. The winners of each group and the six best second-placed teams qualified for EuroBasket 2015. The games were played between 10 August and 27 August 2014.

Group A

|}

Group B

|}

Group C

|}

Group D

|}

Group E

|}

Group F

|}

Group G

|}

Ranking of second-placed teams 
The six best second-placed teams from the groups qualified directly for the tournament. In order to determine them, the results from the games against the fourth-placed teams in each of the groups of four teams were removed from the ranking process.

Top Performers

References

External links
2015 Eurobasket at FIBA Europe website

qualification
2014–15 in European basketball
2015